(corresponding article on Robert Thelen is at German Wikipedia -->deutsch)

Robert Thelen (23 March 1884, Nürnberg - 23 February 1968, Berlin) was a German aviation pioneer and designer.

He was a chief designer of Albatros Flugzeugwerke, responsible among other for Albatros C.I design.

He was the first person to give flying lessons to Melli Beese, the first female German pilot.

References

External links
EarlyAviators.com

1884 births
1968 deaths
Aircraft designers
German aerospace engineers
Engineers from Nuremberg